Harry Fox (1882–1959) was a vaudeville dancer, actor, and comedian.

Harry Fox may also refer to:

 Harry Fox (Hollyoaks), a fictional character
 Harry Fox (sportsman) (1856–1888), English cricketer
 Harry Fox Agency, a copyright collection society

See also
 Henry Fox (disambiguation)

Fox, Harry